The Korea Media Rating Board (KMRB) is a public organization that classifies films, videos, and other motion pictures into age-based ratings and recommends domestic performances of foreign artists. Through these rating systems, the Korea Media Rating Board provides domestic viewers with accurate information for their viewing and protects children from harmful and unsuitable materials.

Established in 1966 as the "Korean Art and Culture Ethics Committee", the organization changed the name to the "Korean Ethics Committee for Performing Arts" in 1976 and The "Korean Council Performing Arts Promotion" in 1997. In June 1999, it finally changed to the current name of "Korea Media Rating Board".

Ratings 
Ratings are determined on films and videos which are classified, stage performances, and advertising. Stage performances have been rated ALL, Teenager restricted, or not rated. Advertisements have generally been rated ALL or not rated. The media that is rated includes:
Nationally produced movies
Foreign movies
Advertisements on:
previews
posters
newspapers
notice boards

Film ratings 

The Korea Media Rating Board (영상물등급위원회) in Busan divides licensed films into the following categories:
  ALL (전체관람가) – Green label: Film suitable for all ages.
  12 (12세이상관람가) – Yellow label: Film intended for audiences 12 and over. Underage audiences accompanied by a parent or guardian are allowed.
  15 (15세이상관람가) – Orange label: Film intended for audiences 15 and over. Underage audiences accompanied by a parent or guardian are allowed.
  18 (청소년관람불가) – Red label: No one under 18 is allowed to watch this film.)
  Restricted screening (제한상영가) – White label: Film needs a certain restriction in screening or advertisement as it is considered a highly bad influence to universal human dignity, social value, good customs or national emotion due to excessive expression of nudity, violence, social behavior, etc.

On January 1, 2021, the KMRB updated their maturity icons.

See also 
Game Rating and Administration Committee – game rating organization that separated from KMRB
Motion picture rating system

References

Website 
KMRB Official Site 
KMRB Official Site 

Motion picture rating systems
Entertainment rating organizations
Government agencies of South Korea